The 2021 M*League Division 1, played between top-level football club in the Northern Mariana Islands, consists of one tournaments: the Spring League.

Spring League

Regular season

References

Marianas Soccer League seasons
Northern Mariana Islands